Persatuan Sepakbola Indonesia Wonosobo (simply known as PSIW Wonosobo) is an Indonesian football club based in Wonosobo Regency, Central Java. They currently compete in the Liga 3.

History
The existence of PSIW Wonosobo has been recorded since 1937. At that time, the Sports Magazine led by Otto Iskandar di Nata which was published in March 1937 wrote that PSIW Wonosobo was listed as 1 of 18 bonds that were members of PSSI. PSIW Wonosobo had an office at Garoengweg or Jalan Garung, one of the PSIW Wonosobo officials at that time was named Moengin. Even though he was registered as a member of PSSI in 1937, the exact date of the birth of PSIW Wonosobo is still a questions until now.

Supporters
In the early 2000s when PSIW competed in the Liga Indonesia Second Division in the Central Java region, PSIW had a group of supporters called "Pecinta Wonosobo Mania" better known as Tawon Mania.

PSIW is also supported by supporter groups called Laskar Kolodete 189 (Laskot 189) and Wonsobo Supporters Unic (Sonic).

Mascot
The name of the PSIW Wonosobo mascot is Dombos, who is in the form of a Javanese lamb wearing the PSIW jersey.

Players

Current squad

Coaching staff

Coaching staff

Management

|}

References

External links

Sport in Central Java
Football clubs in Indonesia
Football clubs in Central Java